The compound of two snub icosidodecadodecahedra is a uniform polyhedron compound. It's composed of the 2 enantiomers of the snub icosidodecadodecahedron.

References 
.

Polyhedral compounds